The United States competed at the 1972 Winter Olympics in Sapporo, Japan.

Medalists 

The following U.S. competitors won medals at the games. In the by discipline sections below, medalists' names are bolded. 

| width="78%" align="left" valign="top" |

| width=22% align=left valign=top |

Alpine skiing

Men

Women

Biathlon

Bobsleigh

Cross-country skiing

Men

Women

Figure skating

Individual

Mixed

Ice hockey

Summary

Roster
Mike Curran
Peter Sears
Wally Olds
Tom Mellor
Frank Sanders
Jim McElmury
Charles Brown
Dick McGlynn
Ronald Naslund
Robbie Ftorek
Stu Irving
Kevin Ahearn
Henry Boucha
Craig Sarner
Timothy Sheehy
Keith Christiansen
Mark Howe

First Round
Winners (in bold) entered the Medal Round. Other teams played a consolation round for 7th-11th places.

|}

Medal round

Sweden 5-1 USA
USA 5-1 Czechoslovakia
USSR 7-2 USA
USA 4-1 Finland
USA 6-1 Poland

Luge

Men

Women

Nordic combined

Ski jumping

Speed skating

Men

Women

References
Official Olympic Reports
International Olympic Committee results database
 
 Olympic Winter Games 1972, full results by sports-reference.com

Nations at the 1972 Winter Olympics
1972
Oly